Lady Evelyn Lake is a lake on the Lady Evelyn River in Timiskaming District, Northeastern Ontario, Canada. 

The highly irregularly shaped lake consists of two parts, about equal in size, separated by the Obisaga Narrows. 

The southern part is within the Obabika River Provincial Park, directly east of the Lady Evelyn-Smoothwater Provincial Park.

Lady Evelyn River is a tributary of the Montreal River, which is a tributary of the Ottawa River.

See also
List of lakes in Ontario

References
 National Resources Canada

Lakes of Timiskaming District